Vashin Chat (also Romanized as Vashīn Chāt and Vashīn Chat; also known as Vashīn Chāh) is a village in Talang Rural District, Talang District, Qasr-e Qand County, Sistan and Baluchestan Province, Iran. At the 2006 census, its population was 352, in 71 families.

References 

Populated places in Qasr-e Qand County